Anna Kimonos (born 15 December 1975) is a retired Cypriot rhythmic gymnast.

She competed for Cyprus in the rhythmic gymnastics all-around competition at the 1992 Summer Olympics in Barcelona. She was 38th in the qualification round and did not advance to the final.

References

External links 
 

1975 births
Living people
Cypriot rhythmic gymnasts
Gymnasts at the 1992 Summer Olympics
Olympic gymnasts of Cyprus